Sir Alfred Jodrell, 4th Baronet (1847-1929) was the fourth and last of the Jodrell Baronets, assuming the title in 1882. The title became extinct on his death.  Jodrell married Jane Grimston, daughter of James Grimston, 2nd Earl of Verulam.

He founded The Shell Museum in Glandford, near his Norfolk home at Bayfield Hall, to house his collection accumulated over six decades. He was a noted public benefactor, restoring old churches, such as St Nicholas, Blakeney, sending provisions to the Norfolk & Norwich Hospital, and rebuilding and administering his estates and other local buildings, such as the watermill. He was High Sheriff of Norfolk in 1887.

References

1847 births
1929 deaths
Baronets in the Baronetage of Great Britain
People from Letheringsett with Glandford
High Sheriffs of Norfolk
English collectors
Grimston family